Mangaroa is a rural settlement just outside of Upper Hutt, situated in the lower North Island of New Zealand. It includes lifestyle blocks and farms surrounded by hills, which are usually covered by a dusting of snow during the winter. 

The former Mangaroa Railway Station is located at Mangaroa.

Mangaroa has its own indie rock radio station, andHow.FM.

The New Zealand Ministry for Culture and Heritage gives a translation of "long stream" for Mangaroa.

Demographics

Mangaroa had a population of 2,034 at the 2018 New Zealand census, an increase of 156 people (8.3%) since the 2013 census, and an increase of 423 people (26.3%) since the 2006 census. There were 681 households. There were 1,035 males and 999 females, giving a sex ratio of 1.04 males per female. The median age was 43.7 years (compared with 37.4 years nationally), with 384 people (18.9%) aged under 15 years, 342 (16.8%) aged 15 to 29, 1,104 (54.3%) aged 30 to 64, and 204 (10.0%) aged 65 or older.

Ethnicities were 94.7% European/Pākehā, 6.8% Māori, 0.9% Pacific peoples, 1.9% Asian, and 2.5% other ethnicities (totals add to more than 100% since people could identify with multiple ethnicities).

The proportion of people born overseas was 21.2%, compared with 27.1% nationally.

Although some people objected to giving their religion, 52.5% had no religion, 34.8% were Christian, 0.1% were Hindu, 0.4% were Buddhist and 2.7% had other religions.

Of those at least 15 years old, 408 (24.7%) people had a bachelor or higher degree, and 183 (11.1%) people had no formal qualifications. The median income was $47,100, compared with $31,800 nationally. The employment status of those at least 15 was that 993 (60.2%) people were employed full-time, 267 (16.2%) were part-time, and 48 (2.9%) were unemployed.

Education

References

External links
 Mangaroa River

Suburbs of Upper Hutt